Lubotyń, Greater Poland Voivodeship
 Lubotyń, Opole Voivodeship

See also 

 Ľubotín
 Liubotyn